Monster Man may refer to:

Monster Man (film) a 2003 comedy horror movie
Monster Man (TV series) a 2012 Syfy reality TV series
Monster Man (novel) a 1994 novel by Glynn Parry
Monsterman (documentary film), a movie about Finnish heavy metal band Lordi
"Monster Man", a song by Soul Coughing from the 1998 album El Oso